Ogarev or Ogaryov is a Russian masculine surname, its feminine counterpart is Ogareva or Ogaryova. It may refer to
Nikolay Ogarev (1813–1877), Russian poet and revolutionary

Russian-language surnames
Surnames of Russian origin